R101 (formerly Radio Milano International, 101 Network, Radio 101, One-O-One, and Radio 101, current name since June 6, 2005) is an Italian radio station that broadcasts adult contemporary music and news bulletin from TG5 and TGCOM.
It is headquartered in Milan, Italy.

Programmes
La Carica di 101
Sportello Centounico
La Ricarica di 101
Mitico!
Molto Personale
Prima di tutti
Gli Stereotipi
Musicology
Il Viaggio
Sabato Italiano
Superclassifica
Disco 101
Molto Personale Hot
La Domenica degli Sportivi
I raccattapalle
Club '80
Club '90
Club 101
Uno per Uno
Smile - Gli italiani fanno ridere
Gran riserva
Sabato stereotipico
Alta fedeltà
Il sabato dello sportello
Scatta in meta

Personalities
Marco Balestri
Paolo Cavallone
Alberto Davoli
Dario Desi
Paolo Dini
Tamara Donà
Lester
Massimo Lopez
Chiara Lorenzutti
Max Novaresi 
Federica Panicucci
Gerry Scotti
Sergio Sironi
Laura Basile
Cristiano Militello
Laura Basile
Elisa Dante
Claudio Cecchetto

External links
Official site

Mass media in Milan
Radio stations in Italy
Radio stations established in 1975
Adult contemporary radio stations